The Regiment "Nizza Cavalleria" (1st) is a cavalry unit of the Italian Army based in Bellinzago Novarese in Piedmont. The regiment is the reconnaissance unit of the Alpine Brigade "Taurinense".

History

Formation 
In 1690 the Duke of Savoy Victor Amadeus II joined the Nine Years' War against the Kingdom of France. On 4 July 1690 the Regiment Dragoons of Piedmontwas formed for service in the war. The regiment consisted of eight companies and fought in 1690 at Avigliana and in 1693 in the Battle of Marsaglia.

After the war the Regiment Dragoons of Piedmont was disbanded on 22 November 1699.

Cabinet Wars 
The regiment was reformed on 14 April 1701 with eight companies, which were grouped into four squadrons. Each company fielded 50 horses. The same year Duke Victor Amadeus II joined the War of the Spanish Succession and the regiment fought in 1706 in the Siege of Turin and then in the Duchy of Savoy. On 27 March 1713 the regiment received two companies from the Regiment Dragoons of His Royal Highness and now consisted of ten companies, which were grouped into five squadrons. The same year the war ended with the Peace of Utrecht, which transferred the Kingdom of Sicily and the regiment moved to Sicily to take possession of the new territory. In October 1713 Victor Amadeus II and his wife, Anne Marie d'Orléans, travelled from Nice to Palermo, where the king and queen were crowned in the cathedral of Palermo on 24 December 1713.

The regiment was garrisoned in 1715-16 in Messina, in 1716-18 in Palermo, an in 1718-20 in Syracuse. In July 1718 Spain landed troops on Sicily and tried to recover the Kingdom of Sicily from Savoy rule. On 2 August 1718 Britain, France, Austria, and the Dutch Republic formed an alliance to defeat Spain in the War of the Quadruple Alliance. The Dragoons of Piedmont fought against Spanish forces on Sicily until 1720, when the Treaty of The Hague restored the position prior to 1717, but with the Savoy and Austria exchanging Sardinia and Sicily. On 16 October 1720 the Dragoons of Piedmont moved from Sicily to Sardinia, where the regiment remained until 1722.

In 1733 King Charles Emmanuel III joined the War of the Polish Succession on the French-Spanish. The regiment fought in 1734 in the Battle of San Pietro and the Battle of Guastalla against Austrian forces.

In 1742 King Charles Emmanuel III joined the War of the Austrian Succession on the Austrian side and the regiment fought in the Battle of Tidone.

In July 1774 the Regiment Dragoons of Piedmont ceded two of its companies to help form the Regiment Dragoons of Chablais" and from then on consisted of eight companies grouped in four squadrons.

French Revolutionary Wars 
In 1792 King Victor Amadeus III joined the War of the First Coalition against the French Republic. From 1792 to 1796 the Dragoons of Piedmont fought against the French Army of Italy. In March 1796 Napoleon Bonaparte arrived in Italy and took command of the French forces, with which he defeated the Royal Sardinian Army in the Montenotte campaign within a month. On 28 April 1796, King Victor Amadeus III had to sign the Armistice of Cherasco and on 15 May 1796 the Treaty of Paris, which forced Sardinia out of the First Coalition. Victor Amadeus III also had to cede the Duchy of Savoy and the County of Nice to France. On 16 October 1796 Victor Amadeus III died and his eldest son Charles Emmanuel IV ascended the throne. On 26 October 1796 King Charles Emmanuel IV ordered to reduce the Kingdom's cavalry forces and the Dragoons of Piedmont was reduced to four squadrons. On the same date the company level was abolished.

In fall 1798 France invaded the remaining territories of King Charles Emmanuel IV. On 6 December 1798 French forces occupied Turin and on 8 December 1798 Charles Emmanuel IV was forced to sign a document of abdication, which also ordered his former subjects to recognise French laws and his troops to obey the orders of the French Army. Charles Emmanuel IV went into exile on Sardinia, while his former territories became the Piedmontese Republic. On 9 December 1798 the Sardinian troops were released from their oath of allegiance to the King and sworn to the Piedmontese Republic. The same month the Regiment Dragoons of Piedmont was renamed 3rd Cavalry Regiment.

In January 1799 the regiment was renamed 3rd Piedmontese Dragoons Regiment. The same month the 2nd Cavalry Regiment, the former Regiment Dragoons of the Queen, was disbanded, and two of its squadrons were transferred to the 3rd Piedmontese Dragoons Regiment. In spring 1799 the regiment fought for the French in the War of the Second Coalition against the Austrians. On 26 March 1799 the regiment fought in the Battle of Verona and then on 5 April in the Battle of Magnano, which the Austrians won, forcing the French out of Italy. With the French retreat the Piedmontese Republic dissolved and the 3rd Piedmontese Dragoons Regiment, like all regiments of the Piedmontese Republic, was disbanded in May 1799.

Restauration 
On 11 April 1814 Napoleon abdicated and on 20 May 1814 King Victor Emmanuel I returned from exile in Sardinia to Turin. On 24 May 1814 Victor Emmanuel I ordered to reform the cavalry regiments disbanded in 1799, including the Regiment Dragoons of Piedmont, which was renamed Regiment "Cavalleggeri di Piemonte" (Chevau-légers of Piedmont). On 1 January 1815 the regiment consisted of six squadrons grouped into three divisions.

On 26 February 1815 Napoleon escaped from Elba and on 1 March 1815 he landed in Golfe-Juan in France. This triggered the War of the Seventh Coalition, which Sardinia joined against France. The Regiment "Cavalleggeri di Piemonte" participated in the Hundred Days campaign, during which the regiment fought on 6 July at Grenoble.

On 1 January 1824 the regiment formed two new squadrons, which were grouped into a newly formed division. On 24 December 1828 the Cavalleggeri di Piemonte provided some of its personnel to help form the new Regiment "Dragoni di Piemonte". On 29 August 1831 the regiment was reduced to six squadrons and a depot squadron, which would have been formed in times of war. On 3 January 1832 the regiment became a heavy cavalry unit again and was renamed Regiment "Nizza Cavalleria" after the County of Nice, which had been returned to the Kingdom of Sardinia after the fall of Napoleon.

Italian Wars of Independence 
In 1848-49 the regiment participated in the First Italian War of Independence, fighting in 1848 in the battles of Mantua, Santa Lucia, Goito, Castellucchio, and Milan, and in 1849 in the battles of Mortara and Novara. For its conduct at the battles of Goito, Mortara, and Novara the regiment was awarded three Bronze Medals of Military Valour.

On 3 January 1850 the regiment was reduced to four squadrons. In 1859 the regiment participated in the Second Italian War of Independence and fought at Borgo Vercelli. On 16 September 1859 the Nizza ceded one of its squadrons to help form the Regiment "Cavalleggeri di Lodi" and on 19 October of the same year the regiment was redesignated as Cuirassiers unit and renamed Regiment "Corazzieri di Nizza". Already on 6 June 1860 the regiment resumed to use its previous name Regiment "Nizza Cavalleria".

In the 1860-1861 the regiment participated in the campaign in central and southern Italy and fought in the battles of Perugia and Spoleto, and in the Siege of Capua. In 1866 the regiment participated in the Third Italian War of Independence and fought in the Battle of Custoza.

Over the next years the regiment repeatedly changed its name:

 10 September 1871: 1st Regiment of Cavalry (Nizza)
 5 November 1876: Cavalry Regiment "Nizza" (1st)
 16 December 1897: Regiment "Nizza Cavalleria" (1st)

In 1887 the regiment contributed to the formation of the Mounted Hunters Squadron, which fought in the Italo-Ethiopian War of 1887–1889. In 1895-96 the regiment provided one officer and 68 enlisted for units deployed to Italian Eritrea for the First Italo-Ethiopian War. On 1 October 1909 the Nizza ceded one of its squadrons to help form new Regiment "Lancieri di Mantova" (25th). In 1911-12 the regiment provided five officers and 157 enlisted to augment units fighting in the Italo-Turkish War.

World War I 
At the outbreak of World War I the regiment consisted of a command, the regimental depot, and two cavalry groups, with the I Group consisting of three squadrons and the II Group consisting of two squadrons and a machine gun section. Together with the Regiment "Lancieri di Vercelli" (26th) the Nizza formed the VII Cavalry Brigade of the 4th Cavalry Division of "Piemonte". The division fought dismounted in the trenches of the Italian Front. In 1916 the regiment was reinforced with the 3rd Squadron of the Regiment "Cavalleggeri di Aquila" (27th) and the same year the regiment was awarded its fourth Bronze Medal of Military Valour for the regiment's conduct in the Battle of Monfalcone. In 1917 the regimental depot in Savigliano formed the 739th and the 1558th dismounted machine gunners companies as reinforcement for infantry units on the front. In 1918 the regiment fought in the Battle of Vittorio Veneto.

Interwar years 
After the war the Italian Army disbanded 14 of its 30 cavalry regiments, which did not affect the Nizza Cavalleria. However on 20 May 1920 a further five cavalry regiments were disbanded and the Nizza received and integrated a squadron of the disbanded Regiment "Lancieri di Montebello" (8th), and received the traditions of the Regiment "Lancieri di Montebello" (8th). The same year the regiment moved from Savigliano to Turin.

In 1935-36 the regiment contributed 14 officers and 436 enlisted for units, which were deployed to East Africa for the Second Italo-Ethiopian War.

World War II 
At the outbreak of World War II the regiment consisted of a command, a command squadron, the I and II squadrons groups, each with two mounted squadrons, and the 5th Machine Gunners Squadron. In June 1940 the regiment participated in the invasion of France and in April 1941 the regiment participated in the invasion of Yugoslavia. In November 1942 the regiment participated in the occupation of Vichy France. After the announcement of the Armistice of Cassibile on 8 September 1943 invading German forces disbanded the regiment in Turin.

During the war the regiment's depot in Turin formed the:
 III Tank Group "Nizza Cavalleria", with L6/40 tanks 
 IV Armored Group "Nizza Cavalleria"
 V Armored Group "Nizza Cavalleria"
 IV Road Movement Battalion "Nizza Cavalleria"
 XI Road Movement Battalion "Nizza Cavalleria"
 LI Dismounted Group "Nizza Cavalleria"
 CXXXII Armored Reconnaissance Group "Nizza Cavalleria"

In September 1941 III Tank Group "Nizza Cavalleria" was sent to Italian Libya and assigned to the 132nd Armored Division "Ariete" for the Western Desert Campaign. After the defeat in the Second Battle of El Alamein the remnants of the III Tank Group participated in the retreat to Tunisia and there in the Tunisian Campaign. The remnants of the Arite and the III Tank Group surrendered to the allies on 13 May 1943.

The IV Armored Group "Nizza Cavalleria", which consisted of one squadron equipped with L6/40 tanks and one squadron equipped with AB-41 armored cars, was sent to Albania. After the announcement of the Armistice of Cassibile on 8 September 1943 the group's armored cars squadron joined the 41st Infantry Division "Firenze", which fought against the Germans and then joined the Albanian National Liberation Army.

At the end of 1943 the Reconnaissance Squadron "Nizza Cavalleria" was formed in Cava dei Tirreni by the Italian Co-belligerent Army. The squadron was initially assigned to the IX Assault Unit, which in June 1944 liberated Cingoli from German occupation in the Battle of Ancona. Afterwards the squadron was assigned to the Polish II Corps for the remainder of the Italian campaign.

Cold War 

On 24 November 1946 the 1st Dragoons Reconnaissance Group was formed in Pinerolo and assigned to the Infantry Division "Cremona". On 1 March 1950 the group was renamed Armored Cavalry Group "Nizza Cavalleria" and on 1 April 1951 it was expanded to 1st Armored Cavalry Regiment "Nizza Cavalleria". The regiment consisted of a command, a command squadron, and three squadrons groups, were equipped initially with Sherman tanks and then with M47 Patton tanks. On 4 November 1958 the regiment was renamed Regiment "Nizza Cavalleria" (4th).

On 15 January 1959 the regiment was disbanded and the regiment's I Squadrons Group was reorganized as divisional reconnaissance group and renamed Squadrons Group "Nizza Cavalleria". The group remained assigned to the Infantry Division "Cremona".

During the 1975 army reform the army disbanded the regimental level and newly independent battalions were granted for the first time their own flags. On 31 July 1975 the Squadrons Group "Nizza Cavalleria" was reorganized and renamed 1st Armored Squadrons Group "Nizza Cavalleria" and assigned the flag and traditions of the  Regiment "Nizza Cavalleria" (1st). The squadrons group consisted of a command, a command and services squadron, two tank squadrons with M47 Patton tanks, and one mechanized squadron with M113 armored personnel carriers. The squadrons groups was assigned to the Motorized Brigade "Cremona".

Recent times 
On 11 September 1991 the 1st Armored Squadrons Group "Nizza Cavalleria" lost its autonomy and the next day the squadrons group entered the newly formed 1st Regiment "Nizza Cavalleria". The regiment consisted of a command, a command and services squadron, and a squadrons group with three armored squadrons equipped with Leopard 1A5 main battle tanks. On the same day the regiment left the Motorized Brigade "Cremona" and was assigned to the 3rd Army Corps. On 1 August 1992 the regiment was renamed Regiment "Nizza Cavalleria" (1st). In 1993 the regiment began to replace its Leopard 1A5 with wheeled Centauro tank destroyers.

In 1996 the regiment was transferred from the 3rd Army Corps to the Armored Brigade "Centauro". When the Centauro was disbanded in 5 October 2002 the regiment was transferred to the Alpine Brigade "Taurinense". On 11 July 2013 the regiment moved from Pinerolo to Bellinzago Novarese, where the regiment took over the barracks of the 4th Tank Regiment, which had moved to Persano.

Current structure 
As of 2022 the Regiment "Nizza Cavalleria" (1st) consists of:

  Regimental Command, in Bellinzago Novarese
 Command and Logistic Support Squadron "Goito"
 1st Reconnaissance Squadrons Group
 1st Reconnaissance Squadron "Mortara"
 2nd Reconnaissance Squadron "Monfalcone"
 3rd Reconnaissance Squadron "Novara"
 Heavy Armored Squadron

The Command and Logistic Support Squadron fields the following platoons: C3 Platoon, Transport and Materiel Platoon, Medical Platoon, and Commissariat Platoon. The three reconnaissance squadrons are equipped with VTLM Lince vehicles and Centauro tank destroyers, the latter of which are scheduled to be replaced by Freccia reconnaissance vehicles. The Heavy Armor Squadron is equipped with Centauro tank destroyers, which are being replaced by Centauro II tank destroyers.

See also 
 Alpine Brigade "Taurinense"

External links
 Italian Army Website: Reggimento "Nizza Cavalleria" (1°)

References

Cavalry Regiments of Italy